Michael Frank Whiting is the director of the Brigham Young University (BYU) DNA Sequencing Center and an associate professor in BYU's Department of Integrative Biology.  Whiting received his bachelor's degree from BYU and his Ph.D. from Cornell University.

Whiting is an expert on the evolution of Diptera and other insects and was the author of the article on Strepsiptera in the Encyclopedia of Insects.  His research has mainly focused on using DNA sequencing to unlock the evolutionary history of insects.

Whiting has also written on why the critics of the Book of Mormon on DNA issues have overstated their case.

Whiting was also involved in the research that led to the discovery of how stick insects had lost their wings and then re-evolved them several million years later.

Sources
 Daniel C. Peterson, ed. The Book of Mormon and DNA Evidence. (Provo: Neal A. Maxwell Institute, 2008) p. vii.
 BYU faculty bio page
 University of Utah announcement of Whiting lecture
 bio-medicine.org article on Whiting's insect discovery and its importance

Living people
Brigham Young University alumni
Cornell University alumni
Brigham Young University faculty
Evolutionary biologists
American Latter Day Saints
Year of birth missing (living people)